The Jagjivan Ram Railway Protection Force Academy (JRRPFA), Lucknow is a civil service training institute run by the Indian Railways to impart training to new joiners to the Indian Railway Protection Force Service (IRPFS). It was established in 1955 at Lucknow, and has since been renamed to Jagjivan Ram RPF Academy(JJRPF Academy) in honour of the Indian freedom fighter and former deputy prime minister. Babu Jagjivan Ram was also Union Railway minister from Dec 7,1956 to April 10, 1962.This academy is currently headed by a director of the rank of Deputy Inspector General, RPF. The total land area of the Academy is 58.3 acre.

References

External links
 Jagjivan Ram RPF Academy website

Training institutes of Indian Railways
Police academies in India
1955 establishments in Uttar Pradesh